Kadavinahosahalli is a village in Hassan district of Karnataka state, India.

Location
Kadavina-Hosahalli village is located on the village road between Kushalnagar and Hassan.

Postal Code
The village has a post office and the PIN code is 573130.

Image gallery

See also
 Athini
 Gorur
 Holenarasipura
 Hassan

References

Villages in Hassan district